The Men's 2010 European Amateur Boxing Championships were held at the Megasport Sport Palace in Moscow, Russia from June 4 to June 13, 2010. It was the 38th edition of this biennial competition organised by the European governing body for amateur boxing, EUBC.

Medal winners

Medal table

External links
Results   
 

European Amateur Boxing Championships
European Amateur Boxing Championships
Boxing
International boxing competitions hosted by Russia
2010 in Moscow
2010 in Russian sport
June 2010 sports events in Russia